Amirabad-e Bala (also Romanized as Amīrābād-e Bālā; also known as Amīrābād-e ‘Olyā and Amir Abad Olya) is a village in Hoseynabad Rural District, Esmaili District, Anbarabad County, Kerman Province, Iran. At the 2006 census, its population was 452, in 89 families.

References 

Populated places in Anbarabad County